The General Oliver Otis Howard House, also known as Howard Hall, is a historic house, and the oldest surviving building on the campus of Howard University, in Washington, D.C.  Built in 1867, it was the home of General Oliver Otis Howard, the university founder and its third president.  The house was declared a National Historic Landmark in 1974. It faces Georgia Avenue NW, just north of Howard Place.

Description and history 
The General Oliver Otis Howard House is located on the west side of the Howard University Campus.  It is separated form Georgia Avenue to the west by a parking lot, and from 6th Street by the Johnson Administration Building, which forms an L around its north side.  It is a -story painted brick building, with a mansard roof providing a full third floor, and a fieldstone foundation that is exposed on the west and south due to the sloping terrain.  A three-story tower projects from the southwest corner, rising to a low balustrade surrounding a mansard roof, which is crowned by iron cresting. Windows are set in segmented-arch windows, and dormers in the roof face have elaborate carved surrounds.  The interior retains some original features, but has in parts been altered to provide modern office space.

The house was built in 1867 as the home of General Oliver Otis Howard.  Of four buildings erected during the founding phase of Howard University, it is the only one still standing. The university was chartered in 1867, when General Howard was serving as commissioner of the federal Freedmen's Bureau.  In that role, Howard was a major supporter of improved educational opportunities for newly freed African Americans.  As a member of the First Congregational Church of Washington, he was instrumental in that congregation's support for creating of the institution as a seminary and normal school.

Howard's house was purchased by the university in 1909.

See also
List of National Historic Landmarks in Washington, D.C.
National Register of Historic Places listings in the upper NW Quadrant of Washington, D.C.

References

External links

General Oliver Otis Howard House, NRHP 'travel itinerary' listing at the National Park Service

National Historic Landmarks in Washington, D.C.
Historic American Buildings Survey in Washington, D.C.
Houses completed in 1867
Howard University buildings
Houses on the National Register of Historic Places in Washington, D.C.
Victorian architecture in Washington, D.C.